The James R. Welker House, at 1127 Central in Safford, Arizona, was built in 1915.  It was listed on the National Register of Historic Places in 1988.

It is a rectangular single-family brick house which includes "traditional" Queen Anne-style features such as shingling below its cornices. The house is surrounded by a low white picket fence.

It was associated with James Welker, who served on Safford's city council and as its postmaster in 1939, and was a merchant.

Welker was a Mormon who arrived in Safford in 1883, and along with other Mormons, was amazed at frontier practices.  According to him, the cowboys "wouild ride into a town, go straight to the saloon, and commence shooting the place up.  They were expert with the pistol too." He stated: "I've seen very wonderful shots among those cowboys. They did not do much killing around here, but they were pretty wild and did about as they pleased.'

See also
 National Register of Historic Places listings in Graham County, Arizona

References

External links
 

National Register of Historic Places in Graham County, Arizona
Buildings and structures completed in 1915
Queen Anne architecture in Arizona
Houses on the National Register of Historic Places in Arizona